Aschat Sports Club is a Libyan football club based in Tripoli, Libya.  The club was founded in 1982. The club is based in the Zaweyat Addahmani region in Tripoli, near the coast. The club did enjoy success in the 1990s, winning a league title in the 1995–96 season, and winning the domestic cup two seasons later, in 1997–98.

By winning the Libyan Cup, they qualified for the CAF Cup Winners' Cup for the 1999 edition. They went out in the second round, losing 6–0 on aggregate to ASC Mineurs of Guinea. They produced a heroic performance in the first round, defeating WA Tlemcen 2–1 in both legs.

Honours
Libyan Premier League: 1
1995/96

Libyan Cup: 1
1997/98

Libyan SuperCup: 0
Finalist: 1998

Olympic Winner: 1
1984

Performance in CAF competitions
CAF Cup Winners' Cup: 1 appearance
1999 – Second Round

Coaching staff

External links
Team profile – soccerway.com
Club logo

Shat
Shat
Sport in Tripoli, Libya
1982 establishments in Libya